John Paul Elford (September 24, 1922 – February 6, 1991) was an American Roman Catholic priest who appointed a bishop but declined the position and was never consecrated.

Born in Pittsburgh, Pennsylvania, on September 24, 1944, Elford moved with his family to Bloomington, Indiana. He went to St. Meinrad Archabbey seminary and received his doctorate in sacred theology from Catholic University of America in Washington, D.C. Elford was ordained to the priesthood for the Archdiocese of Indianapolis on May 27, 1947. On July 15, 1968, Pope Paul VI appointed Elford titular bishop of Acropolis and auxiliary bishop of the Diocese of Fort Wayne–South Bend, Indiana.

In October 1968, Ellford announced that Pope Paul had granted his request to "dispense me from accepting the office of bishop". He offered no explanation and asked the public to accept what he had done "without question". He cited "personal reasons" and said he was "at peace" with the decision.

He died on February 6, 1991.

Notes

External links
Catholic Hierarchy-Father John Paul Elford

1922 births
1991 deaths
Religious leaders from Pittsburgh
People from Bloomington, Indiana
Catholic University of America alumni
Roman Catholic Archdiocese of Indianapolis
Roman Catholic Diocese of Fort Wayne–South Bend
Catholics from Indiana
20th-century American Roman Catholic priests